Beard of Lightning is an album by Phantom Tollbooth, released in 2003 with Robert Pollard on lead vocals.

Track listing

"Mascara Snakes" – 3.15
"Atom Bomb Professor" – 6.01
"Asleep Under Control" – 3.04
"Iceland Continuations" – 3.41
"A Good Looking Death" – 1.57
"The Cafe Interior" – 3.42
"Capricorn's Paycheck" – 3.06
"Gratification to Concrete" – 3.38
"Crocodile to the Crown" – 8.02
"Janus Pan" – 3.50
"Work Like Bullies" – 1.47

Personnel
Robert Pollard – vocals
Dave Rick – guitar
Gerard Smith – bass
Jon Coats – drums

References

2003 albums